Birk Ruud (born 2 April 2000) is a Norwegian freestyle skier in halfpipe and slopestyle and Olympic champion in big air.

In 2016, he won Gold (Slopestyle) at the Winter Youth Olympics at Lillehammer.

He participated at the FIS Freestyle Ski and Snowboarding World Championships 2019, winning a medal.

He has won 4 medals (including 2 golds) in X Games (Norway 2018, Aspen 2019, Aspen 2020, Norway 2020).

During the 2022 Winter Olympics, Ruud qualified first in the inaugural big air event. During the final, Ruud secured the gold medal on his first run, scoring a combined score of 187.75. On his victory run, Ruud did a double 1440 mute holding the Norwegian flag, scoring perfect 69s in doing so.

See also
List of Youth Olympic Games gold medalists who won Olympic gold medals

References

External links
 
 
 
 
 

2000 births
Living people
Sportspeople from Bærum
Norwegian male freestyle skiers
Freestyle skiers at the 2016 Winter Youth Olympics
Youth Olympic gold medalists for Norway
Freestyle skiers at the 2022 Winter Olympics
Olympic freestyle skiers of Norway
Medalists at the 2022 Winter Olympics
Olympic gold medalists for Norway
Olympic medalists in freestyle skiing
21st-century Norwegian people
X Games athletes